"Me and My Crazy World" is the lead single released from the Lost Boyz' second album, Love, Peace & Nappiness. The song, produced by "Ron "DJ Ron G" Bowser, details a love triangle in which Mr. Cheeks and two girls are involved.

The song was a minor crossover hit, peaking at number 52 on the Billboard Hot 100, while also becoming a sizable hit on the R&B and rap charts. "Me & My Crazy World" was the only charting single released from Love, Peace & Nappiness, a farcry from the five charting singles released from the previous album. Problems with the group's label, Uptown Records, which was on the verge of shutting down, caused follow-up singles from Love, Peace & Nappiness and the following album, 1999's LB IV Life to go unnoticed.

Single track listing

A-Side
"Me and My Crazy World" - 5:11
"Me and My Crazy World" (Clean Radio Mix) - 3:58
"Me and My Crazy World" (TV Mix) - 5:11

B-Side
"Summer Time" - 4:18
"Summer Time" (Clean version) - 4:18

Chart history

1997 singles
Lost Boyz songs
1997 songs
Songs written by Mr. Cheeks
Uptown Records singles